Korostiv  is a village located in Stryi Raion (district) of Lviv Oblast (province) in western Ukraine. Korostiv belongs to Skole urban hromada, one of the hromadas of Ukraine. 

Local government–Korostivska village council. Its population is 933.

The first record of Korostiv dates back to 1518.

Until 18 July 2020, Korostiv belonged to Skole Raion. The raion was abolished in July 2020 as part of the administrative reform of Ukraine, which reduced the number of raions of Lviv Oblast to seven. The area of Skole Raion was merged into Stryi Raion.

Monuments of architecture 

The village has two objects listed among architectural monuments of Stryi district.
 The church of St. Paraskeva (wooden) 
 The bell tower of the church St. Paraskeva (wooden)

References

External links 
 weather.in.ua 
 Сколівщина.-Львів.1996 
 Населенні пункти Сколівського району (Коростів )

Literature 
  Page 717.

Villages in Stryi Raion